Charles James Stanley Howard, 10th Earl of Carlisle, DL (8 March 1867 – 20 January 1912), styled Viscount Morpeth from 1889 to 1911, was a British soldier, peer, and Liberal Unionist politician.

Early life
Howard was the eldest son of George Howard, 9th Earl of Carlisle, and the Hon. Rosalind Frances Stanley. His younger brother was Geoffrey William Algernon Howard, an MP and the Vice-Chamberlain of the Household from 1911 to 1915. Upon their mother's death in 1921, his elder sister, Lady Mary (wife of Gilbert Murray) inherited Castle Howard, which was later inherited by their brother Geoffrey upon her death.

His paternal grandparents were MP for Cumberland East, the Hon. Charles Wentworth George Howard (the fifth son of George Howard, 6th Earl of Carlisle) and the former Hon. Mary Priscilla Harriet Parke (second daughter and coheiress of James Parke, 1st Baron Wensleydale). His maternal grandparents were Edward Stanley, 2nd Baron Stanley of Alderley and the former Hon. Henrietta Maria Dillon (eldest daughter of Henry Dillon, 13th Viscount Dillon).

He was educated at Rugby and Balliol College, Oxford.

Career
Howard joined the British Army, and achieved the rank of Captain in the 3rd Border Regiment before he retired from the regular army. He was appointed a captain in the 5th Militia Battalion of the Rifle Brigade (The Prince Consort's Own) on 7 April 1897. The battalion was embodied for active service in the Second Boer War, and he served in South Africa until September 1902, when he returned home on the SS Avondale Castle.

In 1904, he was elected to the House of Commons for Birmingham South, a seat he held until 1911, when he succeeded his father in the earldom and entered the House of Lords. He was appointed a deputy lieutenant of Cumberland in 1905.

Personal life

On 17 April 1894 Lord Carlisle married Rhoda Ankaret, daughter of Colonel Paget Walter L'Estrange and the former Emily Ryves (a daughter of General Ryves). Together, they were the parents of one son and three daughters:

 George Josslyn L'Estrange Howard, 11th Earl of Carlisle (1895–1963), who married Bridget Helen Hore-Ruthven in 1918. They divorced and he married Esme Mary Shrubb Iredell in 1947.
 Constance Howard (1897–1964), who died unmarried.
 Ankaret Cecilia Caroline Howard (1900–1945), who married William Jackson, 7th Baronet in 1927.
 Elizabeth Howard (1903–1969), who married Laurence Robert Maconochie-Welwood in 1934.

Lord Carlisle died 20 January 1912, aged 44, and was laid to rest in a tomb at Lanercost Priory, Cumbria.  He was succeeded in his titles by his only son George. Lady Carlisle survived him by 45 years and died in December 1957, aged 90.

Descendants
Through his son George, he was a grandfather of Carolyn Howard (b. 1919), Charles James Ruthven Howard (1923–1994), and Susan Howard (b. 1948) from George's second marriage.

Notes

References 
Kidd, Charles, Williamson, David (editors). Debrett's Peerage and Baronetage (1990 edition). New York: St Martin's Press, 1990, 

Entry at Who Was Who

External links 
 

1867 births
1912 deaths
Charles Howard, 10th Earl of Carlisle
Border Regiment officers
Deputy Lieutenants of Cumberland
10
People educated at Rugby School
Howard, Charles
Howard, Charles
Howard, Charles
Howard, Charles
Howard, Charles
Carlisle, E10
Alumni of Balliol College, Oxford
Members of the London School Board